Cleft lip and palate transmembrane protein 1-like protein (CLPTM1-like protein), also known as cisplatin resistance-related protein 9 (CRR9p), is a protein that in humans is encoded by the CLPTM1L gene. CRR9p is associated with cisplatin-induced apoptosis. CLPTM1L, which lies within a cancer susceptibility locus on chromosome 5 (5p15.33), has been found to be commonly over-expressed in lung tumors and to confer resistance to apoptosis caused by genotoxic agents in association with up-regulation of the anti-apoptotic protein, Bcl-xL. Inhibition of CLPTM1L has been shown to inhibit oncogenic transformation and tumorigenesis caused by the KRas oncogene partially through the PI3K/Akt survival signaling axis.

See also 
 Cleft lip and palate transmembrane protein 1

References

External links

Further reading